Area code 830 is the telephone area code in the North American Numbering Plan (NANP) for the Texas Hill Country and most of San Antonio's suburbs. It completely surrounds area codes 210 and 726, which serve most of San Antonio itself along with its innermost suburbs.

It was created July 7, 1997, in a split from 210. A few outer portions of the city moved to 830, making San Antonio one of the few cities split between multiple area codes.  This split occurred only five years after 210 split from 512.  However, San Antonio's rapid growth and the proliferation of cell phones and pagers forced the entire suburban ring around San Antonio to change its numbers for the second time in a decade.

Geographically, the area code covers the north-western portions of South Texas.

Prior to October 2021, area code 830 had telephone numbers assigned for the central office code 988. In 2020, 988 was designated nationwide as a dialing code for the National Suicide Prevention Lifeline, which created a conflict for exchanges that permit seven-digit dialing. This area code was therefore scheduled to transition to ten-digit dialing by October 24, 2021.

Counties served by this area code:
Atascosa, Bandera, Bastrop, Bexar, Blanco, Burnet, Caldwell, Comal, De Witt, Dimmit, Edwards, Frio, Gillespie, Guadalupe, Karnes, Kendall, Kerr, Kinney, La Salle, Live Oak, Llano, Maverick, Medina, Real, Uvalde, Val Verde, Wilson, and Zavala

Towns and cities served by this area code:
Artesia Wells, Asherton, Bandera, Barksdale, Batesville, Belmont, Bergheim, Big Wells, Bigfoot, Blanco, Boerne, Brackettville, Bulverde, Camp Wood, Campbellton, Canyon Lake, Carrizo Springs, Castroville, Catarina, Center Point, Charlotte, Christine, Cibolo, Comfort, Concan, Cost, Cotulla, Crystal City, D'Hanis, Del Rio, Devine, Dilley, Doss, Eagle Pass, Ecleto, El Indio, Falls City, Fischer, Floresville, Fowlerton, Fredericksburg, Geronimo, Gillett, Gonzales, Harper, Harwood, Hobson, Hondo, Horseshoe Bay, Hunt, Hye, Ingram, Johnson City, Jourdanton, Karnes City, Kendalia, Kenedy, Kerrville, Kingsbury, Knippa, LaCoste, La Pryor, La Vernia, Lackland AFB, Leakey, Leesville, Leming, Luling, Lytle, Marble Falls, Marion, McQueeney, Medina, Mico, Moore, Mountain Home, Natalia, New Braunfels, Nixon, Ottine, Pandora, Panna Maria, Pearsall, Peggy, Pipe Creek, Pleasanton, Poteet, Poth, Quemado, Rio Frio, Rio Medina, Rocksprings, Rosanky, Round Mountain, Runge, Sabinal, San Antonio, Schertz, Seguin, Smiley, Spofford, Spring Branch, Stockdale, Stonewall, Sutherland Springs, Tarpley, Utopia, Uvalde, Vanderpool, Waring, Westhoff, Whitsett, Willow City, Wrightsboro, and Yancey

See also
List of Texas area codes

References

External links

List of exchanges from AreaCodeDownload.com, 830 Area Code

830
830
San Antonio